Mingchi National Forest Recreation Area is a forest located in Datong Township, Yilan County, Taiwan. It is also named as the Pearl of the North Cross-Island Highway.

Geology
The forest is located at an altitude of 1,150-1,700 meters.

Architecture
The forest features an artificial lake surrounded by gardens designed with Chinese architectural style. It also consists of Ci Garden, Fern Garden, Stone Garden, Sun Yat-sen Memorial Garden and forest trails. It also consists of hostels and lookout pavilion.

See also
 Geography of Taiwan

References

Geography of Yilan County, Taiwan
National forest recreation areas in Taiwan
Tourist attractions in Yilan County, Taiwan